Paavada is a 2016 Indian comedy drama film directed by G. Marthandan and written by Bipin Chandran, based on the story he co-wrote with Shibin Francis. The film is about the life of two alcoholics It stars Prithviraj Sukumaran and Anoop Menon in lead roles along with Miya, Asha Sarath, Nedumudi Venu and Maniyanpilla Raju in supporting roles. The film was produced by Maniyanpilla Raju. The music was composed by Aby Tom Cyriac and released under the label Muzik 247.

Paavada released on 15 January 2016. The film was a commercial success, grossing  from the box office.

Synopsis
The film opens with a poem by Faiz Ahmad Faiz. An alcoholic duo meet at a de-addiction center helps each other to arrange their lives back together with their persistent illness. Pambu Joy's married life is in a muddle due to his alcoholism. Pavada Babu's life is in pieces due to a film he produced in which Sicily, Joy's mother, was the heroine. For financial gain, the film was adulterated by his friend Eldho. Eldho intends to re-release the film's 3D extended version. Both Pambu Joy and Pavada Babu fight through their alcoholism to stop the re-release of the film due to the added pain that it will cause for Babu and to Joy's mother Sicily forms the crux of the story.

Cast

Production
Earlier, Shobana was approached for the role of Sicily, but the actress turned down the role as she was not willing to do mother role of Prithviraj, she was replaced by Asha Sarath. Actor Jayasurya has sung a song for the film, titled "Kuruthakkedinte Koodanu," composed by Aby Tom Cyriac, which describes the character of Joy (Prithviraj). According to Maniyanpilla Raju, the film will have "a lot of twists".

Music

The film's songs are composed by Aby Tom Cyriac with lyrics written by B. K. Hari Narayanan. There are three songs and one is a promo song sung by Nedumudi Venu. Jayasurya, K. G. Ranjith and Nedumudi Venu are the singers. The music was released through the label Muzik 247. The audio music launch was held in a low profile event at Kochi in December 2015, the money generated from which went to Chennai flood victims' relief funds. Aby Tom Cyriac has sampled music from Indian ethnic genre of the early 80s and late 90s.

Release

Theatrical
Paavada  released on 15 January 2016.

Reception

Box office
It completed 100 days theatrical run in the state.

Critical response
The Times of India rated 3.5 out of 5 stars and stated that the movie does try to explain alcoholism as a way of dealing with helplessness and how it can ruin one's credibility. Rediff.com gave 3.5 out of 5: Bipin Chandran's screenplay discusses the ethical, moral and legal issues pertaining to such situations. There are elaborate court scenes that test our patience for two and a half hours. This is one of the fertile periods in Prithviraj's career and he makes it even better with this film. He has to be a breezily comic fellow in the first half that he does unpretentiously making this film yet another winner as far as his performance goes. He gets able support from Anoop Menon, Nedumudi Venu and Maniyanpilla Raju. Paavada can be called a decent effort only if we ignore the flaws. Indiaglitz rated 4 out of 5 and said The story, screenplay and dialogues by Bipin Chandran deserves credit. Director Marthandan could capture the essence of the story and deliver a good narration. Background score was conventional. Editing and cinematography were good with the editing being sharp and camera angles very effective, especially the dramatic part involving Prithviraj and the fight sequences. Performances from Prithviraj, Anoop Menon and Nedumudi were outstanding. Prithviraj has proved his range with this cinema as he lives as Joy onscreen. Anoop Menon holds his own in a demanding character. Miya was adorable as Joy's wife. "Paavada" is sure to stay around for a long time for its one-liners and humour.

References

External links 
 
 

2016 films
2010s Malayalam-language films
Indian comedy-drama films
Films about alcoholism
Films about films
2016 comedy-drama films